Guy Lefrant (1923–1993) was a French equestrian. He won a silver medal in individual eventing at the 1952 Summer Olympics in Helsinki. He won a bronze medal in team eventing at the 1960 Summer Olympics in Rome, together with Jack le Goff and Jéhan Le Roy.

References

External links
 

1923 births
1993 deaths
French male equestrians
French show jumping riders
Olympic equestrians of France
Olympic silver medalists for France
Olympic bronze medalists for France
Equestrians at the 1952 Summer Olympics
Equestrians at the 1960 Summer Olympics
Equestrians at the 1964 Summer Olympics
Olympic medalists in equestrian
Medalists at the 1960 Summer Olympics
Medalists at the 1952 Summer Olympics